Unionville is the name of some places in North America:

Canada
Unionville, Ontario
Unionville GO Station, a station in the GO Transit network located in the community
South Unionville, a community in Markham, Ontario

United States
Unionville, Connecticut
Unionville, Georgia
Unionville, Illinois (disambiguation)
Unionville, Indiana
Unionville, Iowa
Unionville, Frederick County, Maryland
Unionville, Michigan
Unionville, Missouri
Unionville, Nevada
Unionville, New Jersey
Unionville Vineyards, a winery in Unionville.
Unionville, New York (disambiguation) (multiple)
Unionville, North Carolina
Unionville, Ashtabula County, Ohio; on the border with Lake County
Unionville, Columbiana County, Ohio
Unionville, Holmes County, Ohio
Unionville, Morgan County, Ohio
Unionville, Washington County, Ohio
Unionville Center, Ohio
Unionville, Pennsylvania (disambiguation) (multiple)
Unionville, South Carolina, historic settlement now named Union, South Carolina
Unionville, Tennessee
Unionville, Utah, historic settlement now renamed Hoytsville, Utah

See also
Unienville, a French commune